Long Haired Businessmen is a comedy series produced by Funny or Die, which was later acquired by Amazon Prime in 2018. The show follows Seth (George Kareman), Kyle (Pat O’Brien), and Kevin (Ben Wietmarschen), "team leaders" at an unnamed corporation, conducting unknown business. Through them, we are exposed to the insane world of corporate ineptitude and business speak, which is the show's central theme. 

Maintaining the absurd dynamic is an essential element of the show, the bouffant hairpieces are neither explained; nor even acknowledged. According to Thrillist's Dave Infante, this visual gag reflects the tenor of the show itself – divorced from distinguishing context and unburdened by likable characters. Long Haired Businessmen is able to ruthlessly lampoon corporate culture. Its characters speak in non-stop buzzwords and clichés, and while the dialogue occasionally touches on their personal lives, this mostly serves to underline an absence of self-awareness and detachment from the world at large.

Long Haired Businessmen has featured cameos by Will Ferrell, Will Forte, J.K. Simmons, and J Mascis.

References